The Joe Guffey House is a historic house on the north side of Arkansas Highway 110 in rural southwestern Stone County, Arkansas.  Located south of Arlberg in an area known as Old Lexington, it is a T-shaped single-story wood-frame structure, with a gable roof and foundation of stone piers.  A tall gabled projection covers a porch supported by four square posts, with a pedimented gable end that has wide boards with a diamond pattern in the center, and applied bargeboard trim near the peak.  The building corners are pilastered, and an ell extends to its rear.  The house was built about 1900, and was listed on the National Register of Historic Places in 1985 for its architectural significance.

See also
National Register of Historic Places listings in Stone County, Arkansas

References

Houses on the National Register of Historic Places in Arkansas
Houses completed in 1900
Houses in Stone County, Arkansas
National Register of Historic Places in Stone County, Arkansas